The 2010 Wests Tigers season was the eleventh in the joint-venture club's history. They competed in the National Rugby League's 2010 Telstra Premiership, finishing the regular season 3rd (out of 16). The Tigers then came within one game of the grand final but were knocked out by eventual premiers, St. George Illawarra.

Season summary 
The Wests Tigers made headlines in the pre-season with the high-profile signing of former rugby league and rugby union international, Lote Tuqiri. Back-rower Liam Fulton returned from a season in the Super League and former Sydney Roosters prop forward Jason Cayless also joined the club after a four-year stay at St Helens R.F.C. Mark Flanagan joined the club from Super League side Wigan.

Robbie Farah, the team's hooker, retained his role as captain of the side for the second year.

With his first touch of the ball, new recruit Tuqiri scored the club's first try of 2010 in their round one win over the Manly-Warringah Sea Eagles at the Sydney Football Stadium. The Tigers had an exciting start to the season, winning the first four of five games to lead the competition with St George Illawarra, Melbourne Storm and the Gold Coast Titans.

Wests eventually finished the regular season in 3rd position; the highest in the club's history. This was also their first finals appearance since winning the 2005 Telstra Premiership five years earlier. They lost to eventual premiers St George Illawarra Dragons on 25 September 2010 by a score of 13-12 to miss out on the grand final.

Head Coach, Tim Sheens, extended his contract with the Wests Tigers to the end of the 2011 season.

Regular season

Finals Series

Ladder

Gains and losses

Squad

References 

Wests Tigers seasons
Wests Tigers season